Yannis Stavrakakis (born 1970) is a Greek–British political theorist. A member of the Essex School of discourse analysis, he is mainly known for his explorations of the importance of psychoanalytic theory (Freud and Lacan) for contemporary political and cultural analysis and for his discourse studies on populism.

Education and academic career 

Stavrakakis was born in Sheffield, UK. He studied political science at Panteion University (Athens) and discourse analysis at Essex University. He received his MA and PhD degrees from the ‘Ideology and Discourse Analysis’ programme at the University of Essex. His doctoral thesis, completed under the supervision of Ernesto Laclau, was entitled ‘New Directions in the Theory of Ideology and the Case of Green Ideology’.

From 1998 onwards he has worked at the Universities of Essex and Nottingham and at the Postgraduate Programme of the Department of Political Science and History of Panteion University. In 2006 he was appointed Associate Professor at the School of Political Sciences of the Aristotle University of Thessaloniki. He has since been promoted to Professor of Political Discourse Analysis and currently serves as deputy Head of School.

Stavrakakis has also been recently elected (2012) in the executive board of the Hellenic Political Science Association, where he now serves as Vice-President. Within the framework of the Association, he has co-founded a Research Network dedicated to the analysis of political discourse.

Work 

His research interests include contemporary political theory (with emphasis on psychoanalytic and post-structuralist approaches), the analysis of ideology and political discourse in societies of late modernity (with emphasis on the study of political ecology, populism and post-democracy) and the political dimensions of artistic practices and theater. His recent work has focused on the political and psychosocial implications of what he calls "debt societies" of Southern Europe (especially Greece) and on the emerging ideological cleavage between populist and anti-populist discourses within this context. During the 2014-5 period he has served as Principal Investigator of the POPULISMUS research project, co-funded by the European Union. The research focus of the project was on the relationship between populist discourse and democracy and it involved a variety of research and dissemination activities as well as the creation of an international Observatory of populist discourse.

He has authored and co-edited many books in English and Greek and has published numerous articles in journals such as: Journal of Political Ideologies; Journal for Lacanian Studies; Psychoanalysis, Culture and Society; Philosophy and Social Criticism; Constellations; South European Society and Politics; Journal of Modern Greek Studies; Theory, Culture and Society; Third Text; Organization Studies; Planning Theory. Many of his publications have been translated to a variety of other languages including Spanish, German, Japanese, Korean, Turkish, Russian, Bulgarian, etc. He is contributing editor of the journal Psychoanalysis, Culture and Society (Palgrave) and member of the editorial boards of Subjectivity (Palgrave), Journal for Lacanian Studies and Synchrona Themata.

Books in English

References

External links 
 Yannis Stavrakakis speaks at the London School of Economics on ‘Authority, Enjoyment and the Spirits of Capitalism’ (Psychoanalysis and Society Public Lecture, Hong Kong Theatre, Clement House, London School of Economics & Political Science, London, 12 February 2010)
 Yannis Stavrakakis speaks at the Onassis Cultural Centre, 19 January 2011 (in Greek)
  ‘Discourse and Affect: Conceptual and Political Dialectics in Theory and Empirical Analysis’ (59ο Annual Conference of the Political Studies Association, Manchester, April 2009)
 ‘Symbolic Authority, Fantasmatic Enjoyment and the Spirits of Capitalism: Genealogies of Mutual Engagement’ (from Carl Cederström & Casper Hoedemaekers (eds) Lacan and Organization, London: MayFlyBooks, 2010, pp. 59-100)
  ‘On Acts, Pure and Impure’ (International Journal of Zizek Studies, vol. 4, no. 2, 2010)
 Interview published in the Argentinian newspaper Pagina12, 6 September 2010 (in Spanish)
 Interview published in the Argentinian review Consecuencias, June 2011 (in Spanish)
 'Debt Society', Article published in Radical Philosophy, September-October 2013
 'Brutal Nihilism', Article Published in the web-journal CHRONOS, 2013
 Yannis Stavrakakis writes on populism, anti-populism and Europe, 2013
 Recent paper on hegemony and post-hegemony, 2013
 Interview published in the Slovenian magazine Mladina, 2015
 Yannis Stavrakakis addresses the conference organized in Buenos Aires in memory of Ernesto Laclau, 2015
 Interview from Tiempo Argentino, 2015

Greek political philosophers
Political philosophers
Discourse analysts
21st-century Greek philosophers
Academics of the University of Essex
Jacques Lacan
Living people
1970 births
Alumni of the University of Essex
Academic staff of the Aristotle University of Thessaloniki
Panteion University alumni